Brian López Nina (born 20 November 1999) is a Dominican professional footballer who plays as a centre back for Bolivian club Real Santa Cruz. Born in Spain, he represents the Dominican Republic national team.

International career
López made his international debut for the Dominican Republic in 2019.

References

External links

https://globalsportsarchive.com/people/soccer/brian-lopez/290023/
https://elnacional.com.do/dominicano-lopez-jugara-en-el-futbol-boliviano-en-2023/

1999 births
Living people
Dominican Republic footballers
Spanish footballers
Citizens of the Dominican Republic through descent
Spanish people of Dominican Republic descent
Sportspeople of Dominican Republic descent
Association football central defenders
Footballers from Terrassa
Dominican Republic expatriate footballers
Spanish expatriate footballers
Expatriate footballers in Bolivia
Dominican Republic expatriate sportspeople in Bolivia
Spanish expatriate sportspeople in Bolivia
UE Sants players
UA Horta players
Atlético Pantoja players
Real Santa Cruz players
Tercera División players
Liga Dominicana de Fútbol players
Bolivian Primera División players
Dominican Republic youth international footballers
Dominican Republic under-20 international footballers
Dominican Republic international footballers